John Neely may refer to:

 John Neely (musician), jazz tenor saxophonist and arranger
 John Neely (tennis) (1872–1941), American tennis player

See also
 J. Neely Johnson (1825–1872), American lawyer and politician
 John Neely House, a historic house in Thompsons Station, Tennessee